Gillian Elizabeth Wu (born 1943) is a Canadian Immunologist and the former Dean of Pure and Applied Science at York University. She is currently Professor Emerita in York University's Faculty of Science (Department of Biology) and Faculty of Health and also at the University of Toronto Faculty of Medicine.

Early life and education 
Wu was born in London, England and emigrated to Canada in 1951. Her family settled in Southern Ontario, where her father was a shipbuilder and her mother was a homemaker who encouraged her children in their studies

Wu attended McMaster University in Hamilton, Ontario, Canada for her undergraduate studies, completing a BSc degree in Honours Biology in 1967. She went on to become the first female student to enroll in a graduate program in medical biophysics at the University of Toronto (1967-69). Robert A. Phillips supervised Wu's Master's in Science degree (MSc) research. Her thesis, titled Differentiation of Rosette-forming Cells from Clones of Hemopoietic Stem Cells, was supported by two consecutive graduate scholarships from NSERC and the Medical Research Council of Canada (CIHR). Wu's early interest in immunology was encouraged by Hardy Cinader.

When she began her Master's degree (1967), she was the only graduate studies female student in the department.

Scientific career 
After completing her MSc, Wu did not proceed directly to pursue a doctorate. Instead, she worked as a biophysics technician at the Donner Radiation Labs in UC Berkeley (1969-71), and was a research associate at the National Cancer Institute, NIH, in Bethesda, Maryland, US (1975-76). 

In 1980, she began her PhD studies at the University of Toronto in medical genetics under the supervision of Helios Murialdo, which resulted in four publications, including one in Cell. In 1984, she worked as a post-doctoral fellow at the Basel Institute for Immunology, after which she was recruited in 1986 to be an assistant professor in the newly formed Department of Immunology at the University of Toronto. In 1988, she moved to the Department of Molecular and Medical Genetics at the University of Toronto, staying until 1993, when she became a Senior Scientist at the Wellesley Hospital Research Institute. In 1998, Wu became a Senior Scientist at the Ontario Cancer Institute based in Princess Margaret Hospital.

Throughout this time, Wu retained cross-appointments as a professor in the University of Toronto's Departments of Medical Biophysics and Immunology.

In 2001, Wu joined York University as Dean of Science and Engineering in 2001. After serving her term, she retained her professorship in the Department of Biology, but moved her main affiliation to the School of Kinesiology and Health Science (currently the Faculty of Health Sciences), retiring in January 2015.

Despite shutting down her research laboratory, Wu remains active in research. In May 2020, Wu received research funding to collaborate with York University Biology professor Vivian Saridakis, to investigate the hypothesis that variations in the genomic sequences of the virus play a pivotal role in geographic differences in rates of COVID-19 infection, transmission and deaths. 

Over the decades of her scientific career, Wu has been a visiting scientist and professor at the Pasteur Institute in Paris, France (1996) and at Clare Hall, University of Cambridge (2007), where she has been a Life Member since 2008.

Research 
Wu studies how diversity in antigen-specific B-cell and T-cell receptors are generated. As part of her PhD research, she identified a natural mutation in a cell line that inhibited the secretion of immunoglobulins (Ig). Research from her laboratory determined that variation in the strength of V(D)J recombination signal sequence affects the pattern of Ig gene rearrangement and expression. She also examines the role of the immune system in autoimmune diseases and cancers.

Wu's research focuses on the mechanisms of normal and abnormal development in the immune system. To this end, her research is directed in two major areas: 1. Understanding normal B Cell development with particular emphasis on the process of V(D)J recombination; and 2. Understanding abnormal development in the immune system with particular emphasis on studying human cancers and autoimmune diseases.  Approaches include in vivo and bioinformatics analyses.

Personal life 
Wu married Alan Ming-ta Wu, a fellow graduate student who was in Ernest McCulloch's laboratory. They had two sons, Tim Wu and David Wu.

Honours and awards 
Hardy Cinader Award, 2003
John D. Reynolds Award, 2016
Aventis Pasteur CSI Bernhard Cinader Prize for Research and Education, 2003
Scientist, Medical Research Council of Canada, 1994 - 1999
Scholar, Medical Research Council of Canada, 1989 - 1994 
Studentship, Medical Research Council of Canada, 1980 - 1984
Graduate Scholarship, Medical Research Council of Canada, 1968 - 1969 
Graduate Scholarship, National Research Council of Canada, 1967 - 1968

References 

British emigrants to Canada
Living people
Canadian immunologists
Women immunologists
University of Toronto alumni
McMaster University alumni
1943 births
Scientists from London
Academic staff of York University
Academic staff of the University of Toronto